Sopeira is a municipality located in the province of Huesca, Aragon, Spain. According to the 2004 census (INE), the municipality has a population of 100 inhabitants.

The restored Romanesque Abbey of Santa María de Alaón, a former Benedictine monastery of the 12th century, is located here.

References

Municipalities in the Province of Huesca